Hagler is a surname. Notable people with the surname include:

People with surname or given name 
Lyle Hagler Boren (1909–1992), American politician
Collins Hagler (born 1935), Canadian football player
Ellis Hagler (1908–1990), American football player and coach
King Hagler (c. 1700 – 1763), leader of the Catawba Indian Nation
Louise Hagler, author of The Farm Vegetarian Cookbook
Marvin Hagler (1954–2021), American boxer
Sherry Hagler, keyboardist for Birtha
Steve Hagler, guitarist for Starcastle
Tyjuan Hagler (born 1981), American football linebacker

Places 
Hagler, Ohio
Hagler-Cole Cabin
Hagler Field, previous name for Pensacola International Airport
William Hagler House

Other 
Freddie Norwood (born 1970), boxer known as "Lil Hagler"
Waldman-Hagler rules, a combining rule